The 2021 season for the  road cycling team was its 25th season overall and the second consecutive year as a UCI WorldTeam.

Team roster 

Riders who joined the team for the 2021 season

Riders who left the team during or after the 2020 season

Season victories

References

External links 
 

Cofidis
2021
Cofidis